Geraldine Mary Harris (born 1957) is Professor of Theatre Studies at the University of Lancaster and former Director of Palatine, the Subject Centre for Dance, Drama and Music.

Her early research was in female performers in 19th Century French Popular Theatre specifically "Le Music Hall" and "Le Cafe-concert" but her interest in feminism and the aesthetics and politics of subjectivity and identity has subsequently expanded into the field of contemporary experimental performance.

In the past she worked as a devisor, writer, director and adapter both inside and outside of education, having written or adapted and directed touring shows for schools, taken shows to the Edinburgh Festival and occasionally contributed to the work of Insomniac Productions, a professional touring company. She also wrote the text for a short film "With the Light On", for Third Angel Independent Production Company.

Partial bibliography
Staging Femininities (Manchester University Press, 1999)
Beyond Representation (Manchester University Press, 2006)
Feminist Futures co-editor (Palgrave MacMillan, 2006)
Performance Practice and Process: Contemporary [Women] Practitioners co-authored (Palgrave Macmillan, 2008)
A Good Night Out for the Girls: Popular Feminisms in Theatre and Performance (Palgrave Macmillin, 2012)

References

External links
 
Home page
Palatine

1957 births
Living people
Academics of Lancaster University
British women academics